Simon Melkianus Tahamata (born 26 May 1956) is a Dutch-Moluccan football coach and former professional player who played for Dutch and Belgian clubs. He also played 22 times for the Dutch national team, scoring twice. Tahamata was born in the Netherlands, but took Belgian nationality in 1990.

International career
Tahamata made his national team debut on 22 May 1979 in Bern, Switzerland in the 75th Anniversary Match of the FIFA against Argentina.

Managerial career
After his career as a professional football player Tahamata went on to work as a youth coach for Standard Liège, Germinal Beerschot and Ajax Amsterdam. Occasionally he also played for the team of old Ajax players, named Lucky Ajax. From 2009 he worked for a period as a technical coach for the youth teams of under-10 until under-15 of the Saudi Arabian football club Al-Ahli. Since October 2014 Tahamata is back at Ajax.

Since September 2015, next to his duties at Ajax, he also has a football academy, Simon Tahamata Soccer Academy.

Career statistics

International goals

Honours

Club
AFC Ajax
Eredivisie: 1976–77, 1978–79, 1979–80
KNVB Cup: 1978–79

Standard Liège

 Belgian First Division: 1981–82, 1982–83
 Belgian Cup: 1980–81 (winners), 1983-84 (runners-up)
 Belgian Super Cup: 1981, 1983
 European Cup Winners' Cup: 1981-82 (runners-up)
 Intertoto Cup Group Winners: 1980, 1982

Beerschot
Belgian Cup: 1994-95 (runners-up)

Individual 

 Man of the Season (Belgian First Division): 1990-91
 Belgian Fair Play Award: 1993-94, 1994-95

References

External links

 Profile 

1956 births
Living people
Dutch footballers
Netherlands international footballers
Dutch football managers
Dutch people of Moluccan descent
AFC Ajax players
Standard Liège players
Feyenoord players
Eredivisie players
Dutch expatriate footballers
Dutch expatriate sportspeople in Belgium
Expatriate footballers in Belgium
Belgian Pro League players
People from Vught
Beerschot A.C. players
AFC Ajax non-playing staff
Dutch people of Indonesian descent
Association football midfielders
Standard Liège non-playing staff
Beerschot A.C. non-playing staff
Al Ahli Saudi FC non-playing staff